Dheeraj Singh Moirangthem (born 4 July 2000), is an Indian professional footballer who plays as a goalkeeper for Goa in the Indian Super League. He gained fame for his performance at the 2017 FIFA U-17 World Cup.

Club career

Early life and career 
Born in Manipur, Dheeraj was part of the AIFF Elite Academy batch that was preparing for the 2017 FIFA U-17 World Cup to be hosted in India. After the tournament, Singh was selected to play for the Indian Arrows, an All India Football Federation-owned team that would consist of India under-20 players to give them playing time. He made his professional debut for the side in the Arrow's first match of the season against Chennai City. He started and kept the clean sheet as Indian Arrows won 3–0. On 31 December 2017 he ended his contract with the AIFF to attend trials in Europe, beginning with Motherwell in the Scottish Premiership.

Kerala Blasters
Dheeraj represented Kerala Blasters in the 2018–19 Indian Super League season. He was the first choice goalkeeper for the club. Dheeraj played his first match for the club on 29 September 2018 in the opening fixture of the 2018-19 Indian Super League season against ATK which ended 0-2 to the Blasters. He played 13 league matches and one Super Cup match with the club. He pulled off some miraculous saves earning praises from different managers. His stunning performance in the season for Blasters earned him place in the India U23 National Team.

ATK
After an impressive season for Kerala Blasters, Dheeraj signed for Indian Super League side ATK for the 2019-20 season. He played just one match for ATK throughout the campaign as he was charted on the lineup on 22 February 2020 for the match against Bengaluru FC which ended in 2-2 draw. He has also signed a football sponsorship deal with PUMA.

ATK Mohun Bagan 
After the merger of ATK with Mohun Bagan, Dheeraj signed for ATK Mohun Bagan  for the 2020-21 Indian Super League Season.

Goa 
On 15 January 2021, it was announced that Dheeraj has signed a three year deal with Goa. He made his debut for Goa on 29 November against SC East Bengal. 

He was named in AFC Champions League team of matchday for his performance against Al-Rayyan on 14 April 2021, where he kept a cleansheet. He again kept a cleansheet in a match against Al Wahda on 17 April. Dheeraj won the man of the match award in a match against Persepolis on 20 April. He has emerged as the best goalkeeper in the group league round of the AFC Champions League even though his side failed to advance to the knockouts in its maiden appearance. He made a whopping 26 saves in five matches to top the goalkeeping chart of the West Zone group league stage. "Dheeraj Singh certainly made a name for himself on his continental debut, pulling off a tournament-leading 26 saves in just five games, among them a number of memorable efforts that earned high praise from impressed observers," the AFC said on its website. On November 26 2021, he was named in the AFC Champions League team of the season, the first Indian player to achieve so.

International

India U17 
Dheeraj represented the India U17 side that participated in the 2017 FIFA U-17 World Cup which was hosted in India. He was the first choice goalkeeper and played all three group matches that India had. Even though he couldn't keep a clean sheet in any of the World Cup games, he was highly praised by fans and various managers for his technique and skills.

India U23 
Even though he could earn a place in the India National U-23 team. Dheeraj was again the first choice goalkeeper for India U23 for the 2020 AFC U-23 Championship qualifiers. He earned his spot in the team after a brilliant season with the Kerala Blasters in the 2018-19 ISL Season. He made his debut against Qatar U23 in an international friendly preparatory match for the 2019 AFC U23 Championship Qualifiers.

Career statistics

Club

Honours 

India
SAFF Championship: 2021

Individual
AFC Champions League Team of the Tournament: 2021

References

2000 births
Living people
People from Manipur
Indian footballers
AIFF Elite Academy players
Indian Arrows players
Association football goalkeepers
Footballers from Manipur
I-League players
India youth international footballers
Indian Super League players
Kerala Blasters FC players
FC Goa players
ATK (football club) players
ATK Mohun Bagan FC players